Chaim Leib Pekeris (June 15, 1908 – February 24, 1993) was an Israeli-American physicist and mathematician. He made notable contributions to geophysics and the spectral theory of many-electron atoms, in particular the Helium atom. He was also one of the designers of the first computer in Israel, WEIZAC.

Biography
Pekeris was born in Alytus, Vilna Governorate on June 15, 1908. With the assistance of his uncle, Pekeris and his two brothers emigrated to the United States around 1925. He entered the Massachusetts Institute of Technology in 1925 graduating in 1929 with a B.Sc. in meteorology. Pekeris also took his graduate studies at MIT, studying under Carl-Gustav Rossby. He married Lea Kaplan, a Lithuanian born woman in January 1933. He graduated with his doctoral degree in 1933 as well.

In 1934 Pekeris joined the faculty at M.I.T. as an instructor in geophysics in the Department of Geology. He became a US citizen in 1938. Pekeris remained at M.I.T until 1941 when he moved to the Hudson Laboratories of Columbia University to conduct military research. In 1946 he joined the Institute for Advanced Study.

Pekeris and his wife moved to Israel in 1948 where he joined the Weizmann Institute as head of its Department of Applied Mathematics in 1949. During the 1948 Arab–Israeli War he was involved in a clandestine program in New York State developing munitions for the newborn State of Israel.

He received the Gold Medal from the Royal Astronomical Society in 1980, and the Israel Prize from  the State of Israel in 1981. Teddy Kollek, the mayor of Jerusalem from 1965 to 1993, said in 1990: "I have told you a lot about Chaim Pekeris tonight and there is much more that I could tell, but you will understand that there are reasons that I can’t. Let me simply say that Chaim Pekeris played a most significant role in the establishment of the State of Israel." He died in Rehovot, Israel on February 24, 1993.

Awards and honors
 Rockefeller Fellow (1934)
 Fellow of the American Physical Society (1941) 
 Guggenheim Fellowship (1946)
 Member of the American Philosophical Society (1971)
 Member of the National Academy of Sciences (1972)
 Vetlesen Prize (1974)
 Member of the American Philosophical Society (1974)
 Gold Medal of the Royal Astronomical Society (1980)
 Israel Prize, for physics (1980).

See also 
List of Israel Prize recipients
List of geophysicists

References

External links
Biographical memoir by Freeman Gilbert

1908 births
1993 deaths
American emigrants to Israel
20th-century American Jews
20th-century American physicists
Institute for Advanced Study visiting scholars
20th-century Israeli Jews
Israeli mathematicians
Israeli physicists
Israel Prize in physics recipients
Lithuanian Jews
Massachusetts Institute of Technology School of Science alumni
Massachusetts Institute of Technology School of Science faculty
Members of the United States National Academy of Sciences
Recipients of the Gold Medal of the Royal Astronomical Society
Rockefeller Fellows
20th-century American mathematicians
Jewish physicists
Fellows of the American Physical Society
Lithuanian emigrants to the United States
Members of the American Philosophical Society